Vlada Ekshibarova  (born 14 March 1989; formerly known as Vlada Katic) is an Israeli-Uzbekistani tennis player. She competed for her native Uzbekistan (born in Soviet Uzbekistan), and now competes for Israel.

She has won eight singles and 15 doubles titles on the ITF Circuit. On 14 July 2008, Ekshibarova reached her best singles ranking of world No. 352. On 20 June 2016, she peaked at No. 319 in the doubles rankings.

Career
Ekshibarova made her WTA Tour debut at the 2004 Tashkent Open, having received a wildcard into the doubles tournament with Dilyara Saidkhodjayeva, but they lost to Ekaterina Bychkova and Maria Goloviznina in the first round. Playing for Uzbekistan at the Fed Cup, Ekshibarova had a win–loss record of 1–9.

In 2016, she became an Israeli citizen. In June 2016, Ekshibarova decided to play for Israel instead of Uzbekistan.

In December 2017, Ekshibarova won the Israel Tennis Women's Singles Championship, beating Deniz Khazaniuk 7–6, 5–4 (ret.) in the final, and won the Doubles Championship, partnering with Maya Tahan.

In 2018, she played for the Israel Fed Cup team, going 0–3 in singles. In Fed Cup, she has an overall win–loss record of 1–14.

ITF Circuit finals

Singles: 19 (8 titles, 11 runner-ups)

Doubles: 32 (15–17)

References

External links
 
 
 

1989 births
Living people
Sportspeople from Tashkent
Israeli female tennis players
Jewish Israeli sportspeople
Jewish tennis players
Israeli people of Uzbekistani descent
Israeli people of Soviet descent
Israeli people of Uzbekistani-Jewish descent
Uzbekistani emigrants to Israel
Uzbekistani female tennis players
Uzbekistani Jews